Miniyeh-Danniyeh District is a district in the North Governorate of Lebanon. As its name indicates, the district includes the Dinniyeh, and the Miniyeh regions. The town of Miniyeh serves as district a capital during fall and winter, while the town of Syr Dinniyeh serves as a capital during spring and summer. The district is known for its natural richness. It extends over the northern and western hills of Al-Makmel mountain overlooking the Northern Lebanese and Syrian Coasts.

References

External links 

Districts of Lebanon
Miniyeh-Danniyeh District